History Hunters is a British television series that aired on Channel 4 from 1998 to 1999. Presented by the actor Tony Robinson, the show was a spin-off of the archaeology series Time Team, first broadcast on Channel 4 in 1994. The series is also known as Time Team: History Hunters.

Each episode of History Hunters featured people trying to discover more about an area and its history.

Production
The programme's producer was Tim Taylor, the creator of Time Signs and executive producer of Time Team.

Episodes
There were seven episodes of History Hunters shown on Saturdays from 21 November 1998 to 16 January 1999. Each episode features three teams trying to investigate the history of a community by using resources that are available to anyone. The teams have only two days to find out as much as they can. They have the help of a team of experts.
The episode looking at malting in Marshfield, South Gloucestershire was shot as the pilot in February 1998, and the experts included Gloucester archivist David Smith and local buildings expert Linda Hall. Local farmer Dick Knight described how his grandfather was the last working maltster in the village. Decision-makers at Channel 4 liked the programme and gave the go-ahead for six more, but showing them on Saturday afternoons was doomed to failure and the series sank without trace. The seven programmes were never repeated.

See also
 List of Time Team episodes
 Time Team Specials
 Time Team Others

References

External links
 

1998 British television series debuts
1999 British television series endings
Channel 4 original programming
Time Team